Robertas Kuncaitis (born January 9, 1964 in Šilutė, Lithuania) is a Lithuanian basketball coach who is currently an assistant coach for BC Khimki.  He was a head coach of Neptūnas and assistant coach of the Lithuania national basketball team in the 2010–2011 season. On 6 May 2011, Neptūnas terminated the contract with Robertas Kuncaitis because of poor results.

Career 

2002–2004: BC Šilutė head coach
2004: BC Lietuvos Rytas assistant coach
2004–2005: KK Neptūnas head coach
2005–2006: BC Lietuvos Rytas assistant coach
2006–2007: KK Neptūnas head coach
2007–2008: BC Šiauliai head coach
2008–2010: BC Lietuvos Rytas assistant coach
2010–2011: KK Neptūnas head coach
2007–2012: Lithuania national basketball team assistant coach
2013–2015: ČEZ Basketball Nymburk assistant coach
2016-2017: BC Šilutė head coach
2017-2018: BC Lietuvos Rytas assistant coach
2018-2019: Lietkabelis Panevėžys assistant coach
2019-present: BC Khimki assistant coach

Wins 

 LKAL champion – 2003
 LKL vice-champion – 2004
 LKL champion – 2006
 BBL champion – 2006
 Bronze in EuroBasket 2007
 ULEB Eurocup champion 2009

References 

Lithuanian basketball coaches
Living people
1964 births
BC Rytas coaches
People from Šilutė
BC Neptūnas coaches
BC Lietkabelis coaches